The North Carolina Highway Historical Marker Program was created by the North Carolina General Assembly in 1935. Since that time over 1600 black and silver markers have been placed along numbered North Carolina highways throughout the state. Each one has a brief description of a fact relevant to state history, and is located near a place related to that fact.

Historical Marker Districts 
North Carolina's counties are divided into seventeen districts for the highway marker program; each district is designated by a letter, and covers between four and eight counties. Each marker is assigned an identifier that begins with the letter of the district.

References

External links 
 North Carolina Highway Historical Marker Program, Searchable Database.
 Guide to North Carolina Highway Historical Markers, July 2020 Edition.
 North Carolina Highway Historical Markers -- a web map of all 1600+ highway historical markers.
 North Carolina Highway Historical Marker Facebook Page.

Roads in North Carolina
Historical markers in the United States